The Montsoult–Maffliers station is a railway station in Montsoult (Val d'Oise department), France which also serves nearby Maffliers. It is on the Épinay-Villetaneuse–Le Tréport-Mers railway and is also the interchange station for the Montsoult-Maffliers – Luzarches spur line. The station is used by Transilien line H trains from Paris to Persan-Beaumont and Luzarches.

In 2002, the station served between 2,500 and 7,500 passengers per day. There are 69 free parking spaces and 450 paid spaces.

History
The Compagnie des chemins de fer du Nord (Nord company) opened the Épinay – Persan-Beaumont via Montsoult section of the Épinay – Le Tréport line in 1877, and the Montsoult – Luzarches spur in 1880.

References

External links

 

Railway stations in Val-d'Oise
Railway stations in France opened in 1877